Circulocrania is an extinct genus of trilobites in the family Cyclopygidae.  The genus lived during the later part of the Arenig stage of the Ordovician Period, approximately 478 to 471 million years ago.

References

Cyclopygidae
Asaphida genera
Early Ordovician trilobites of Europe
Fossils of Great Britain